Darko Pavićević (born 27 December 1986) is a Montenegrin footballer.

Club career
A big striker, Pavićević played in Hungary and for Vllaznia Shkodër in the Albanian Superliga.

He left Austrian lower league side FC Deutschkreutz in October 2016 for private reasons, just after scoring his first goal for the club.

References

External links
 Austrian league stats - ÖFB

1986 births
Living people
Footballers from Podgorica
Association football forwards
Montenegrin footballers
OFK Titograd players
OFK Grbalj players
Zalaegerszegi TE players
Kecskeméti TE players
KF Vllaznia Shkodër players
Montenegrin First League players
Nemzeti Bajnokság II players
Nemzeti Bajnokság I players
Montenegrin expatriate footballers
Expatriate footballers in Hungary
Montenegrin expatriate sportspeople in Hungary
Expatriate footballers in Albania
Montenegrin expatriate sportspeople in Albania
Expatriate footballers in Austria
Montenegrin expatriate sportspeople in Austria